Ricardo Tellechea (born November 16, 1953) is a Paraguayan pistol shooter. He competed at the 1984 Summer Olympics in Los Angeles. He came 67 in the mixed skeet shooting, with a total score of 146 points.

References

Paraguayan male sport shooters
Living people
Olympic shooters of Paraguay
Shooters at the 1984 Summer Olympics
Skeet shooters
1953 births